Jorge Lavelli (born 1932, Buenos Aires) is a French theater and opera director of Italian ethnicity and Argentine origin. The son of Italian immigrants in Argentina, Lavelli has lived in France since the early 1960s. He became a French citizen in 1977.

Career
In 1963 he staged Witold Gombrowicz's play The Marriage, introducing this playwright to the French public. Lavelli later staged Gombrowicz's Yvonne, Princess of Burgundy (1965) and Operetta (1971).

In 1967, Lavelli began a collaboration with Jean Vilar to stage Goethe's Triumph der Empfindsamkeit (Triumph of Sensitivity) and Oscar Panizza's The Cathedral of Love (1969; sets and costumes by the surrealist painter Leonor Fini). From 1987 to 1996 he was head of the Théâtre de la Colline in Paris.

Lavelli has staged plays by Calderón, Shakespeare, Corneille, Ramón del Valle-Inclán, García Lorca, Ionesco, Schnitzler, Brecht, Pirandello, Dürrenmatt, Thomas Bernhard, O'Neill, Arthur Miller, Harold Pinter, Peter Handke, Edward Bond, George Tabori, Chekhov, Bulgakov, and Mrocze, and operas by Bartók, Bizet, Debussy, Gottfried von Einem, Gounod, Janáček, Luigi Nono, Maurice Ohana, Prokofiev, Stravinsky and Heinrich Sutermeister. As an opera director he worked mainly for the Paris Opera, but also for the Vienna State Opera, La Scala, and the Aix-en-Provence Festival.

Recognition
Lavelli has won theatrical prizes in France, Spain, and Italy. He was made Commander of the Order of Arts and Letters in 1993, Commander of the Order of the Legion of Honor in 1994, and Chevalier (in 1992) and Officer (in 2002) of the National Order of Merit. He has been nominated seven times for the Molière Award for best director, although he has never won.

References
El teatro de Jorge Lavelli: el discurso del gesto (J. Tcherkaski, 1983 - Buenos Aires: Editorial de Belgrano - ) 
Jorge Lavelli, des années 60 aux années Colline: un parcours en liberte (A. Satgé, 1996 - Paris: PUF)

External links
Brief biography at alternativateatral.com 

French theatre directors
People from Buenos Aires
Living people
1932 births
Argentine emigrants to France
Commanders of the Ordre national du Mérite
Commandeurs of the Ordre des Arts et des Lettres
Officiers of the Légion d'honneur